Collier Peak is located on the border of Alberta and British Columbia. It was named in 1903 after Collier, Dr. Joseph.

See also
List of peaks on the Alberta–British Columbia border
Mountains of Alberta
Mountains of British Columbia

References

Collier Peak
Collier Peak
Canadian Rockies